Dendrocnide is a genus of approximately 40 species of plants in the nettle family Urticaceae. They have a wide distribution across North East India, Southeast Asia, Australia and the Pacific Islands. In Australia they are commonly known as stinging trees.

Description
Plants in this genus are evergreen shrubs or small trees, with the exception of the aptly-named giant stinging tree (D. excelsa) which may reach  in height. Dendrocnide species have a sympodial growth habit and are armed with fine needle-like stinging hairs. They are generally fast-growing and produce soft wood, and are usually found in areas of disturbed forest where they fill the role of a pioneer species.

The leaves are simple, alternate, and petiolate, (i.e. having long petioles or leaf-stems), and the leaf blade may be either entire or have some form of dentate toothing (notches or teeth on the edges of the leaf). The leaves are also often large, and may be either leathery or papery. The stipules are fused and deciduous, leaving conspicuous scars on the twigs after falling.

The inflorescences are axillary and pedunculate, flowers are either solitary or in racemes or panicles. Male flowers may be 4- or 5-merous and the female flowers are 4-merous. Most species are dioecious, a small number are monoecious.

Fruits are an achene, often compressed, and may be eclosed within the swollen pedicel.

Taxonomy
The genus Dendrocnide was raised in 1851 by the  Dutch physician, botanist, and taxonomist Friedrich Anton Wilhelm Miquel (1811–1871) who dedicated a large part of his life to describing specimens of the flora of the Dutch East Indies which were sent to him by his many contacts. This genus was first published in the work Plantae Junghuhnianae,  in which he described three species, namely D. peltata, D. costata (the original type species that is now known as D. stimulans) and D. coerulea.

Etymology
The name of this genus comes from Ancient Greek déndron (tree), and knī́dē (nettle), referring to the large size of most species in this genus.FRList of species

The following list shows all 42 species recognised by Plants of the World Online, and a brief summary of its distribution.
 Dendrocnide amplissima (Blume) Chew - Maluku Islands, Sulawesi
 Dendrocnide basirotunda (C.Y.Wu) Chew - China south-central, Myanmar, Thailand
 Dendrocnide carriana Chew - Lesser Sunda Islands, Maluku Islands, New Guinea, Philippines
 Dendrocnide celebica Chew - Sulawesi
 Dendrocnide contracta (Blume) Chew - Java
 Dendrocnide corallodesme (Lauterb.) Chew - New Guinea, Queensland
 Dendrocnide cordata (Warb. ex H.J.P.Winkl.) Chew - Lesser Sunda Islands, New Guinea, Bismarck Archipelago
 Dendrocnide cordifolia (L.S.Sm.) Jackes - Queensland
 Dendrocnide crassifolia (C.B.Rob.) Chew - Philippines, Sulawesi
 Dendrocnide densiflora (C.B.Rob.) Chew - Philippines
 Dendrocnide elliptica (Merr.) Chew - Borneo, Philippines
 Dendrocnide excelsa (Wedd.) Chew - New South Wales, Queensland
 Dendrocnide gigantea (Poir.) Chew - Melanesia
 Dendrocnide harveyi (Seem.) Chew - Cook Islands, Fiji, Niue, Samoa, Tonga
 Dendrocnide kajewskii Chew - Solomon Islands
 Dendrocnide kjellbergii Chew - Sulawesi
 Dendrocnide kotoensis (Hayata ex Yamam.) B.L.Shih & Yuen P.Yang - Taiwan
 Dendrocnide latifolia (Gaudich.) Chew - Caroline Islands, Marianas, New Caledonia, Solomon Islands, Vanuatu
 Dendrocnide longifolia (Hemsl.) Chew - Bismarck Archipelago, Maluku Islands, New Guinea, Solomon Islands, Sulawesi
 Dendrocnide luzonensis (Wedd.) Chew - Philippines
 Dendrocnide meyeniana (Walp.) Chew - Philippines, Taiwan
 Dendrocnide microstigma (Wedd.) Chew - Java, Lesser Sunda Islands, Maluku Islands, Sulawesi
 Dendrocnide mirabilis (Rech.) Chew - New Guinea, Solomon Islands
 Dendrocnide morobensis Chew - New Guinea
 Dendrocnide moroides (Wedd.) Chew - Lesser Sunda Islands, New South Wales, Queensland, Vanuatu
 Dendrocnide nervosa (H.J.P.Winkl.) Chew - New Guinea, Solomon Islands
 Dendrocnide oblanceolata (Merr.) Chew - Borneo, Sulawesi
 Dendrocnide peltata (Blume) Miq. - Christmas Island, Java, Lesser Sunda Islands, New Guinea
 Dendrocnide photinophylla (Kunth) Chew - New South Wales, Queensland
 Dendrocnide pruritivus H.St.John - Fiji, Wallis and Futuna
 Dendrocnide rechingeri (H.J.P.Winkl.) Chew - Bismarck Archipelago, New Guinea, Solomon Islands
 Dendrocnide rigidifolia (C.B.Rob.) Chew - Philippines
 Dendrocnide schlechteri (H.J.P.Winkl.) Chew - Bismarck Archipelago, New Guinea, Solomon Islands
 Dendrocnide sessiliflora (Warb.) Chew - Bismarck Archipelago, New Guinea
 Dendrocnide sinuata (Blume) Chew - Nepal to southern China and western Malesia including Christmas Island
 Dendrocnide stimulans (L.f.) Chew - China (Guangdong), Hainan, Taiwan, Indo-China, western and central Malesia
 Dendrocnide subclausa (C.B.Rob.) Chew - Philippines
 Dendrocnide ternatensis (Miq.) Chew - Lesser Sunda Islands, Maluku Islands, New Guinea
 Dendrocnide torricellensis (Lauterb.) Chew - New Guinea
 Dendrocnide urentissima (Gagnep.) Chew - Cambodia, south-central and south-east China, Vietnam
 Dendrocnide venosa (Elmer) Chew - Philippines
 Dendrocnide vitiensis'' (Seem.) Chew - Fiji, New Caledonia, Samoa

References

Notes

 
Urticaceae genera
Dioecious plants